This is a list of graphic art works with LGBTQ characters. This list includes gay, lesbian, bisexual and transgender fictional characters, and others within the LGBTQ+ community, in comic series, newspaper strips, graphic novels, and manga.

History
In the 1950s, American comic books, under the Comics Code Authority, adopted the Comic Code which, under the  guise of preventing "perversion", largely prevented the presentation of LGBT characters for a number of decades.

Within the Japanese anime and manga, yaoi is the tradition of representing same-sex male relationships in materials that are generally created by women artists and marketed mostly for Japanese girls  while the genre known as yuri focuses on relationships between women.

List of works

See also

 List of animated series with LGBTQ+ characters
 List of lesbian, gay, bisexual or transgender-related films
 Lists of television programs with LGBTQ+ characters
 Lists of American television episodes with LGBTQ+ themes
 List of animation and graphic art works with polyamorous characters

References

 
Graphic art works
 
 
Graphic art works
LGBT portrayals in mass media